General Morgan may refer to:

Charles Morgan (British Army officer) (1741–1818), British Indian Army lieutenant general
Daniel Morgan, Continental Army brigadier general
Edwin D. Morgan (1811–1883), Union Army major general
Frederick E. Morgan, British Army lieutenant general, planner of Operation Overlord during World War II
George W. Morgan (1820–1893), Union Army brigadier general
Hill Godfrey Morgan (1862–1923), British Army brigadier general
J. H. Morgan (1876–1955), British Army brigadier general
James Morgan (congressman) (1756–1822) New Jersey Militia major general in the American Revolutionary War
James D. Morgan (1810–1896), Union Army brigadier general and brevet major general
John Morgan (physician) (1735–1789), Chief physician & director general of the Continental Army
John Hunt Morgan, Confederate State Army brigadier general, leader of Morgan's Raid
John Tyler Morgan, Confederate States Army brigadier general
Michael Ryan Morgan (1833–1911), Union Army brevet brigadier-general
Mohammed Said Hersi Morgan, Somali military and faction leader
Thomas R. Morgan (born 1930), U.S. Marine Corps general
William Duthie Morgan (1891–1977), British Army general

See also
Attorney General Morgan (disambiguation)
Curt von Morgen (1858–1928), German Heer General of Infantry